Bromley is a surname. Notable people with the surname include:

 Allan Bromley (historian) (1947–2002), Australian historian of computing
 Allyn Bromley (born 1928), American artist and art educator
 Bruce Bromley (1893–1980), American trial lawyer
 Cuthbert Bromley, VC, (1878–1915), British army officer
 D. Allan Bromley (1926–2005), Canadian-American physicist
 Darwin Bromley (1950–2019), American board game designer
 David Bromley (artist) (born 1960), Australian artist
 David G. Bromley, American sociologist
 Eliot Bromley-Martin (1866–1946), English cricketer
 Ernest Bromley, (1912–1997) American civil rights activist and tax resister
 Ernest Bromley (cricketer) (1912–1967), Australian cricketer
 Gordon Bromley (1916–2006), long-distance runner from New Zealand
 Granville Bromley-Martin (1875–1941), English cricketer
 H. Thomas Bromley (1853–1924), English artist
 Hugh Bromley-Davenport (1870–1954), English cricketer
 John Bromley (disambiguation), various people of that name
 Kristan Bromley (born 1972), English skeleton racer
 Marion Bromley, (1912–1996), American civil rights activist and tax resister
 Massey Bromley, 19th century British locomotive engineer
 Nelly Bromley (1850–1939), English actor and singer
 Nick Bromley (born 1983), Australian middle-distance track athlete
 Paulie Bromley (born 1974), bass player for Australian roots music band "The Beautiful Girls"
 Peter Bromley (1929–2003), English horse-racing commentator
 Philip Bromley (1930–2007), English cricketer
 Thomas Bromley (disambiguation), various people of that name
 Yulian Bromley (1921–1990), Soviet anthropologist